Barack Obama (born 1961) is the 44th president of the United States from 2009 to 2017.

Barack Obama may also refer to :

 Barack Obama Sr. (1936–1982), a Kenyan senior governmental economist and the father of Barack Obama
 Barack Obama in comics, a character portrayed in several comics, often portraying the former president
 President Barack Obama (painting), a 2018 portrait of Barack Obama by the artist Kehinde Wiley for the National Portrait Gallery
 Presidency of Barack Obama, the period of time from January 20, 2009 – January 20, 2017 with Barack Obama as president
 Barack Obama: Der schwarze Kennedy, a German-language biography of President Barack Obama
 Barack Obama "Joker" poster, a poster
 Barack Obama "Hope" poster, a poster

See also 
 
 
 List of topics related to Barack Obama
 List of things named after Barack Obama
 Barack (disambiguation)
 Obama (disambiguation)